Through the Night is the debut album from Ren Harvieu released on May 14, 2012 on Island Records. It entered the UK mid-week  album chart at number 2.

Background
The release of the album was postponed after the accident which happened on May 31, 2011. Ren Harvieu was with friends in an East London field, watching them performing acrobatic leaps over a hedge when she was knocked to the ground and broke her back. "I heard it snap. I couldn't feel my feet. I wasn't on drugs or even drunk. I thought I was gonna die," the singer recalled. After a 14-hour operation Harvieu spent months recovering at the Stanmore's Royal National Orthopaedic Hospital, not knowing whether she’ll be able to walk again.

Reception
Through the Night received generally positive reviews from music critics upon its release. At Metacritic, which assigns a normalized rating out of 100 to reviews from mainstream critics, the album received an average score of 63, based on 7 reviews, which indicates "generally favorable reviews."

Track listing

Charts

References

2012 debut albums
Island Records albums